Phurpa Tsering is an Indian politician of the Bharatiya Janata Party in Arunachal Pradesh.

He served as the president of the Dirang Bloc Congress Committee between 2001 and 2003, later serving as the West Kameng District Youth Congress president 2003-2005. He was elected unopposed to the West Kameng Zilla Parishad, representing the Thembang Block. Between 2007 and 2008 he served as the chairman of the Zilla Parishad as well as being the president of the West Kameng District Congress Committee.

Tsering stood as a People's Party of Arunachal candidate in the Dirang seat and was elected to the Arunachal Pradesh Legislative Assembly in the 2009 election, defeating the incumbent Indian National Congress MLA Tsering Gyurme. Tsering obtained 6,618 votes against 5,085 votes for Tsering Gyurme. In June 2012 Tsering was named Parliamentary Secretary for Science and Technology by Chief Minister Nabam Tuki.

Tsering was re-elected unopposed from Dirang in the 2014 Arunachal Pradesh Legislative Assembly election as well as in 2019 Arunachal Pradesh Legislative Assembly election.

References

People's Party of Arunachal politicians
Indian National Congress politicians
Living people
People from West Kameng district
Arunachal Pradesh district councillors
Arunachal Pradesh MLAs 2014–2019
Year of birth missing (living people)
Bharatiya Janata Party politicians from Arunachal Pradesh
Arunachal Pradesh MLAs 2009–2014
Arunachal Pradesh MLAs 2019–2024